Josh Thewlis may refer to:
 Josh Thewlis (Australian footballer)
 Josh Thewlis (rugby league)